Alexander Nikolayevich Vyssotsky (23 May 1888 – 31 December 1973) was a Russian-American astronomer. Born in Moscow, in 1923 he moved to the United States, where he eventually became professor at the University of Virginia and vice-president of the American Astronomical Society.

During his 35 years at the McCormick Observatory of the University of Virginia, he was sequentially promoted from instructor to assistant professor in 1928, and to professor in 1937. His best known work is probably a catalog with five lists of stars titled Dwarf M Stars Found Spectrophotometrically. This work was important because it was the first list of nearby stars identified not by their motions in the sky, but by their intrinsic, spectroscopic, characteristics. Until this time, most nearby stars had been identified by their large proper motions; however, not all stars close to the Sun have a large proper motion, and this selection criteria caused a bias in studies before the advent of Vyssotsky's catalogue. Vyssotsky's survey was carried out at McCormick Observatory using a 10-inch Cooke astrograph, donated by the Carnegie Institution of Washington and refigured by J. W. Fecker. It was used with an objective prism, which allowed spectra to be taken of all the stars in the field of view simultaneously. The spectra allowed Vyssotsky and others to classify the stars according to the surface temperature and gravity of the stars, and they identified thousands of dwarf M stars (which are intrinsically faint, and therefore had to be nearby if they were visible through the 10-inch).

Vyssotsky spent his youth in Moscow, Russia, where he worked in a major observatory. He served in the Russian army and took part in World War I, where he used his knowledge of French, English and German to translate intercepted radio communications. After the October Revolution he joined the anti-communist White movement, and after its defeat escaped to Turkey and then to Tunisia, where he worked as a science teacher. In 1923 he moved to the United States, where in 1929 he married a fellow astronomer Emma Vyssotsky. She was his lifelong scientific collaborator. They had one son, Victor A. Vyssotsky, a mathematician and computer scientist who was involved in Multics project and created the Darwin computer game.

References

External links
Articles by Vyssotsky. adsabs.harvard.edu

1888 births
1973 deaths
American astronomers
Russian astronomers
Scientists from Moscow
Moscow State University alumni
University of Virginia faculty
White Russian emigrants to the United States